The Persian Gulf campaign of 1819 was a British punitive expedition, principally against the Arab maritime force of the Al Qasimi in the Persian Gulf, which embarked from Bombay, India in November 1819 to attack Ras Al Khaimah. The campaign was militarily successful for the British and led to the signing of the General Maritime Treaty of 1820 between the British and the Sheikhs of what was then known as the "Pirate Coast", would become known as the "Trucial Coast" after this treaty. Today, the territory comprises much of the United Arab Emirates.

Background 
After decades of incidents where British shipping had fallen foul of the aggressive Al Qasimi, an expeditionary force embarked for Ras Al Khaimah in 1809. This campaign led to the signing of a peace treaty between the British and Hussan Bin Rahmah, the Al Qasimi leader. This broke down in 1815. J. G. Lorimer contends that after the dissolution of the arrangement, the Al Qasimi "now indulged in a carnival of maritime lawlessness, to which even their own previous record presented no parallel".

In 1815, the crew of a British Indian vessel were captured by Al Qasimi near Muscat and most of the crew were murdered. Then, on 6 January Al Qasimi captured an armed pattamar, the Deriah Dowlut, off the coast of Dwarka and murdered 17 of its 38 Indian crew. In the Red Sea, in 1816, three British-flagged Indian merchant vessels from Surat were taken and most of the crews killed.

Following the incident involving the Surat vessels (said to have been carried out by Amir Ibrahim, a cousin to the Al Qasimi Ruler Hassan Bin Rahmah) an investigation took place and Ariel was despatched to Ras Al Khaimah from Bushire, to where it returned with a flat denial of involvement in the affair from the Al Qasimi who were also at pains to point out they had not undertaken to recognise 'idolatrous Hindus' as British subjects, let alone anyone from the West Coast of India other than Bombay and Mangalore.

A small squadron assembled off Ras Al Khaimah and, on Sheikh Hassan continuing to be 'obstinate', opened fire on four vessels anchored there. Firing from too long a range, the squadron expended some 350 rounds to no effect; it then disbanded, visiting other ports on the coast. Unsurprisingly, given this ineffective 'punishment', Lorimer reports "The temerity of the pirates increased" and further raids on shipping followed, including the taking of "an Arab vessel but officered by Englishmen and flying English colours" just 70 miles North of Bombay.

After an additional year of recurring incidents, at the end of 1818 Hassan bin Rahmah made conciliatory overtures to Bombay that were "sternly rejected." Naval resources commanded by the Al Qasimi during this period were estimated at around 60 large boats headquartered in Ras Al Khaimah, carrying from 80 to 300 men each, as well as 40 smaller vessels housed in other nearby ports.

The case against the Al Qasimi has been contested by the historian, author and Ruler of Sharjah, Sultan bin Mohammed Al Qasimi in his book The Myth of Arab Piracy in the Gulf, in which he argues that the charges amount to a 'causus belli' by the East India Company, which sought to limit or eliminate the 'informal' Arab trade with India, and presents a number of internal communications between the Bombay Government and its officials, which shed doubt on many of the key charges made by Lorimer in his history of the affair. At the time, the Chief Secretary of the Government of Bombay, F. Warden, presented a minute which laid blame for the piracy on the Wahhabi influence on the Al Qasimi and the interference of the East India Company in native affairs. Warden also successfully argued against a proposal to install the Sultan of Muscat as Ruler of the whole peninsula. Warden's arguments and proposals likely influenced the shape of the eventual treaty concluded with the Sheikhs of the Gulf coast.

Campaign 

On 3 November 1819, the British embarked on an expedition against the Al Qasimi, led by Major-General William Keir Grant, voyaging to Ras Al Khaimah with a force of 3,000 soldiers. The British extended an offer to Said bin Sultan of Muscat in which he would be made ruler of the Pirate Coast if he agreed to assist the British in their expedition. Obligingly, he sent a force of 600 men and two ships. The naval force consisted of Liverpool, Eden, and a number of gun and mortar boats. Captain Collier, of Liverpool, 'led the naval force. The Bombay Marine of the East India Company (EIC) contributed six armed vessels: the 16-gun Teignmouth under the command of Captain Hall, the EIC senior captain, the 16-gun Benares, the 14-gun , the 14-gun Nautilus, the 12-gun Ariel, and the 12-gun . Later two frigates and 600 men belonging to the Sultan of Muscat joined the expedition.

On the army side, Grant commanded some 3,000 troops in transports, including the 47th and 65th Regiments of Foot, the 1st Battalion of the 2nd Regiment of Native Infantry, the flank companies of the 1st Battalion of the 3rd Regiment of Native Infantry and of the Marine Battalion, and half a company of Pioneers. In all, 1,645 European soldiers and marines and 1,424 Indian sepoys took part in the expedition.

The force gathered off the coast of Ras Al Khaimah on  25 and 26 November and, on 2 and 3 December, troops were landed south of the town and set up batteries of guns and mortars and, on 5 December, the town was bombarded from both land and sea. Collier placed Captain Walpole of Curlew in charge of the gun boats and an armed pinnace to protect the landing, which was, however, unopposed. The bombardment of the town commenced on 6 December, from landed batteries of 12 pound guns and mortars as well as from sea. On 7 December, two 24-pound cannon from Liverpool were added to the land batteries.

The rout of Ras Al Khaimah led to only five British casualties as opposed to the 400 to 1000 casualties reportedly suffered by the Al Qasimi.

The fall of Dhayah Fort 
On the fall of Ras Al Khaimah, three cruisers were sent to blockade Rams to the North and this, too was found to be deserted and its inhabitants retired to the 'impregnable' hill-top fort of Dhayah.The British landed a force on 18 December, which fought its way inland through date plantations to Dhayah Fort on the 19th. There, 398 men and another 400 women and children held out, without sanitation, water or effective cover from the sun, for three days under heavy fire from mortars and 12-pound cannon.

The two 24-pound cannon from HMS Liverpool which had been used to bombard Ras Al Khaimah from the landward side were once again pressed into use and dragged across the plain from the coastal mangrove swamps of Rams, a journey of some three miles. Each of the guns weighed over two tonnes. After enduring two hours of sustained fire from the big guns, which breached the fort's walls, the last of the Al Qasimi surrendered at 10.30 on the morning of 22 December.

Many of the people in the fort were herders and farmers who had fled there on the arrival of the British and of the 398 people who surrendered, only 177 were identified as fighting men. The British flag was briefly flown from the fort before it was blown up. British losses from the action at Dhayah included one officer and three men killed and sixteen wounded.

The British expeditionary force then blew up the town of Ras Al Khaimah and established a garrison there of 800 sepoys and artillery, before visiting Jazirat Al Hamra, which was found to be deserted. They went on to destroy the fortifications and larger vessels of Umm Al Qawain, Ajman, Fasht, Sharjah, Abu Hail, and Dubai. Ten vessels that had taken shelter in Bahrain were also destroyed. The Royal Navy suffered no casualties during the action.

Treaty and aftermath 
With the Sheikhs of these communities either in captivity or choosing to give themselves up, a treaty was proposed in order to govern peaceful relationships in the future, the General Treaty of Maritime Peace of 1820. The treaty opens, 'In the name of God, the merciful, the compassionate! Praise be to God, who hath ordained peace to be a blessing to his creatures.'

Under the auspices of the UK's representative Sir William Keir Grant, the treaty prohibited piracy in the Persian Gulf, banned slavery and required all usable ships to be registered with British forces by flying distinctive red and white flags which exist today as the flags of the respective emirates.

The treaty was signed by the Sheikhs of Khatt and Falaya; Jazirah Al Hamra; Abu Dhabi, Rams and Dhayah, Dubai, Sharjah, Ajman, and Umm Al Qawain. It was to lead to a permanent peace and an era of unprecedented prosperity, as well as establishing thriving coastal trading communities, some of which would grow to become global cities.

References 

Conflicts in 1819
Anti-piracy battles involving the United Kingdom
Military campaigns involving Great Britain
History of the Persian Gulf
History of the United Arab Emirates
Treaties of the Trucial States
Treaties of the United Kingdom (1801–1922)
Military history of the British East India Company
History of the Royal Navy
1819 in the British Empire
Piracy in the Persian Gulf
Battles involving the United Kingdom

